You Can Win If You Want is Modern Talking's second single released from their debut album The 1st Album. The single was released on 13 March 1985 and entered the top 10 in Germany on 13 May 1985, after spending three weeks within the top-5, the single reached the top eventually going gold and selling well over 250,000 units in Germany alone.

The single peaked at No. 8 in France where it also reached a gold status for sales of 500,000 units.

The video for the song was shot at Bavaria Studios in Munich and directed by Michael Bentele.

Single 
7" Single
 "You Can Win If You Want" (Special Single Remix) - 3:44
 "One in a Million" - 3:42

12" Maxi
 "You Can Win If You Want" (Special Dance Version) - 5:19		
 "You Can Win If You Want" (Instrumental) - 3:43
 "One in a Million" - 3:42

Chart position

Certifications

References

1985 singles
Modern Talking songs
Songs written by Dieter Bohlen
Number-one singles in Germany
Number-one singles in Austria
Song recordings produced by Dieter Bohlen
1985 songs
Ariola Records singles